Harvey Whiteley (born 26 September 1998) is a professional rugby league footballer who plays as a  for the Hunslet RLFC in the RFL League 1.

In 2017 he made his Super League début for Leeds against the Wigan Warriors.

References

External links
Leeds Rhinos profile

1998 births
Living people
Dewsbury Rams players
English rugby league players
Hunslet R.L.F.C. players
Leeds Rhinos players
Rugby league hookers
Rugby league players from Leeds